Wang Li (born 4 December 1962) is a Chinese former cyclist. She competed in the women's road race event at the 1984 Summer Olympics and 1986 Asian Games.

References

External links
 

1962 births
Living people
Chinese female cyclists
Olympic cyclists of China
Cyclists at the 1984 Summer Olympics
Place of birth missing (living people)
Asian Games medalists in cycling
Cyclists at the 1986 Asian Games
Medalists at the 1986 Asian Games
Asian Games silver medalists for China
20th-century Chinese women